Big Fish was a Swedish experimental rock music group with influences from industrial music, punk, jazz, blues, metal and folk music, adding up to a unique sound.

Discography 
 The Natural Powers
 Hydrology (1990)
 Död mans vals (1991)
 Vargavinter (1992)
 Dans mot tiden (1993)
 Sånger ur sten (1994)
 Nyårshambo (1994)
 Blues för Paranoia (1996)
 Andar i halsen (1996)

On compilations 
 Definitivt 50 Spänn #5
 Clubland X-Treme 2 (disc 1)
 Definitivt 50 Spänn IV
 I Sometimes Wish I Was Famous: A Swedish Tribute to Depeche Mode

Swedish rock music groups
Musical groups from Uppsala